Rosario Martínez (born 8 April 1948) is a Salvadoran athlete. She competed in the women's shot put at the 1968 Summer Olympics.

References

External links
 

1948 births
Living people
Athletes (track and field) at the 1968 Summer Olympics
Salvadoran female shot putters
Olympic athletes of El Salvador
Place of birth missing (living people)
20th-century Salvadoran women